The 1983 Detroit Tigers finished in second place in the American League East with a record of 92-70 (.568), six games behind the Orioles.  The Tigers outscored their opponents 789 to 679.  The Tigers drew 1,829,636 fans to Tiger Stadium in 1983, ranking 8th of the 14 teams in the American League.

Offseason
 February 21, 1983: Dave Revering was signed as a free agent by the Tigers.
 March 15, 1983: Julio González was signed as a free agent by the Tigers.
 March 25, 1983: Stine Poole (minors) and cash were traded by Tigers to the Minnesota Twins for Sal Butera.

Regular season

Season standings

Record vs. opponents

Notable transactions
 June 6, 1983: 1983 Major League Baseball draft
Jeff Robinson was drafted by the Tigers in the 3rd round.
D. J. Dozier was drafted by the Tigers in the 18th round, but did not sign.
 June 30, 1983: Pat Underwood was traded by the Tigers to the Cincinnati Reds for Wayne Krenchicki.

Roster

Player stats

Batting

Starters by position
Note: Pos = Position; G = Games played; AB = At bats; H = Hits; Avg. = Batting average; HR = Home runs; RBI = Runs batted in

Other batters
Note: G = Games played; AB = At bats; H = Hits; Avg. = Batting average; HR = Home runs; RBI = Runs batted in

Pitching

Starting pitchers
Note: G = Games; IP = Innings pitched; W = Wins; L = Losses; ERA = Earned run average; SO = Strikeouts

Other pitchers
Note: G = Games pitched; IP = Innings pitched; W = Wins; L = Losses; ERA = Earned run average; SO = Strikeouts

Relief pitchers
Note: G = Games pitched; W= Wins; L= Losses; SV = Saves; GF = Games Finished; ERA = Earned run average; SO = Strikeouts

Award winners and league leaders

Kirk Gibson
 #2 in AL in triples (9)
 #10 in AL in Power/Speed Number (14.5)

Larry Herndon
 #2 in AL in triples (9)
 #8 in AL in hits (182)
 #10 in AL in at bats (603)
 #10 in AL in total bases (288)

Chet Lemon
 AL leader in times hit by pitch (20)

Aurelio López
 AL All Star Team, pitcher

Jack Morris
 AL leader in strikeouts (232)
 AL leader in innings pitched (293-2/3)
 AL leader in wild pitches (18)
 AL leader in batters faced (1204)
 #2 in AL in strikeouts per 9 innings pitched (7.11)
 #2 in AL in games started (37)
 #2 in AL in complete games (20)
 #2 in AL in strikeout to walk ratio (2.80)
 #4 in AL in wins (20)
 #4 in AL in walks plus hits per innings pitched (WHIP) (1.158)
 #4 in AL in hits allowed (257)
 #5 in AL in home runs allowed (30)

Lance Parrish
 AL Gold Glove Award, catcher
 AL Silver Slugger Award, catcher
 AL All Star Team, catcher
 AL leader in runners caught stealing (54)
 AL leader in sacrifice flies (13)
 Finished 9th in AL MVP voting
 #3 in doubles (42)
 #3 in AL in extra base hits (72)
 #4 in AL in RBIs (114)
 #6 in AL in outs (479)
 #8 in AL in total bases (292)
 #9 in AL in home runs (27)
 #9 in AL in at bats (605)
 #9 in AL in strikeouts (106)
 #9 in AL in times grounded into double plays (21)

Dan Petry
 AL leader in games started (38)
 AL leader in home runs allowed (37)
 #2 in AL in earned runs allowed (116)
 #2 in AL in wild pitches (12)
 #3 in AL in innings pitched (266-1/3)
 #3 in AL in bases on balls allowed (99)
 #3 in AL in batters faced (1115)
 #5 in AL in wins (19)
 #5 in AL in hits allowed (256)

Alan Trammell
 AL Gold Glove Award, shortstop
 AL leader in sacrifice hits (15)
 Finished 15th in AL MVP voting
 #4 in AL in batting average (.319)
 #5 in AL in Power/Speed Number (19.1)
 #8 in AL in on-base percentage (.385)
 #9 in AL in times caught stealing (10)

Lou Whitaker
 AL Gold Glove Award, second baseman
 AL Silver Slugger Award, second baseman
 AL All Star Team, second baseman
 AL leader in games played at second base (160)
 Tiger of the Year Award, by Detroit baseball writers
 Finished 8th in AL MVP voting
 #2 in AL in plate appearances (720)
 #2 in AL in singles (148)
 #2 in AL in times on base (273)
 #3 in AL in batting average (.320)
 #3 in AL in hits (206)
 #3 in AL in at bats (643)
 #4 in AL in games (161)
 #5 in AL in runs created (114)
 #7 in AL in total bases (294)
 #7 in AL in doubles (40)
 #7 in AL in sacrifice flies (8)
 #9 in AL in times caught stealing (10)

Milt Wilcox
 #4 in AL in wild pitches (10)

Players ranking among top 100 all time at position
The following members of the 1983 Detroit Tigers are among the Top 100 of all time at their position, as ranked by The Bill James Historical Baseball Abstract:
 Lance Parrish: 19th best catcher of all time
 Lou Whitaker: 13th best second baseman of all time 
 Alan Trammell: 9th best shortstop of all time 
 Kirk Gibson: 36th best left fielder of all time

Farm system

LEAGUE CHAMPIONS: Birmingham

Notes

References

1983 Detroit Tigers Regular Season Statistics at Baseball Reference

Detroit Tigers seasons
Detroit Tigers season
Detroit Tiger
1983 in Detroit